The October 27, 1982, coup d'état attempt was a conspiracy conceived in Spain to overthrow the government. Meant to take place on October 27, 1982, a day before national elections, the plan was discovered and foiled the preceding October 1. Although made public, the importance of the coup attempt was downplayed with the cooperation of the main media, in order to avoid raising social unrest. This coup d'état plan hardly affected the election campaign for the October 28 elections, won by Spanish Socialist Workers' Party (PSOE). Over time, it has become an obscure chapter in Spanish history.

Dismantlement
The plans for the coup d'état were more precise than those of the 23-F previously attempted coup. On October 1, the Home Office Secretary Juan José Rosón had knowledge of the conspiracy. After appraising the situation, Rosón as well as the president of government Leopoldo Calvo Sotelo, Minister of Defence Alberto Oliart and Manglano, director of the CESID, decided it was preferable to intervene in a quick way, without more investigations, to avoid a more complicated situation. Because of this, on  Sunday October 2, early in the morning, the three top suspects were arrested. They were Artillery Colonels Luis Muñoz Gutiérrez and Jesús Crespo Cuspinera, as well as his brother, lieutenant colonel José Crespo Cuspinera. At the same time several persons, convicted for the 23-F coup were moved to other prisons, notably the chief of that coup, Jaime Milans del Bosch into Algeciras correctional.

The lists implicated about four hundred persons.

It is evident that Jaime Milans del Bosch met Colonel Muñoz Gutiérrez, one of the three implicated, in Fuencarral prison. Milans Bosch would be freed and he would lead the rest of the actions of the coup d'état.

The plan
The plan, codenamed "MN", possibly in relation to the Movimiento Nacional, was to prepare several violent actions against progressive personalities, autonomists and leftists, to culminate later with a great explosion in a block of military houses in Madrid. All this would be blamed on ETA and the inefficiency in the fight against the terrorism, as a means to justify military intervention.

The action would be carried out on 27 October, eve of the general elections. At a certain time which was not specified, the Academy of Artillery of Fuencarral where Milans del Bosch was, would be occupied. Later the chain of command would be neutralized occupying the Captaincy General of Madrid and the center of operations of the Board of Joint Chiefs of Staff. The state of war would be declared and 80 commandos would be positioned in three rings that would encircle Madrid, controlling all power headquarters, like Zarzuela, (royal residence), Moncloa (governmental residence), Ministries, Spanish television TVE and radio stations. Conspirators counted on collaboration by Unit of Colmenar Viejo Helicopters and two Companies of Special Operations (COES) of Madrid.

Consequences
The three persons arrested were put to trial, but the investigation was not especially rigorous. The strategy of the PSOE, that won the elections of the 28 October by absolute majority, was to minimize this conspiracy, attempting to reinstate relationships with a distrustful army.

Bibliography
 Diego Carcedo, "Sáenz de Santa María. El general que cambió de bando", 

Conflicts in 1982
Spanish transition to democracy
Spanish Coup D'état Attempt, 1982
Spain
Attempted coups in Spain
October 1982 events in Europe